The 1990/91 FIS Ski Flying World Cup was the 1st official World Cup season in ski flying awarded with small crystal globe as the subdiscipline of FIS Ski Jumping World Cup.

Calendar

Men

Standings 
Points were still distributed by original old scoring system.

Ski Flying

Nations Cup unofficial

References 

World cup
FIS Ski Flying World Cup